The 2014 Phillips 66 National Swimming Championships were held from August 6 to 10, 2014, at the William Woollett Jr. Aquatics Center in Irvine, California.

Men's events

Women's events

References

External links
 Omega Timing Results

United States Swimming National Championships
USA Swimming Championships
USA Swimming Championships
USA Swimming Championships
USA Swimming Championships